The New Zealand foreshore and seabed controversy is a debate in the politics of New Zealand. It concerns the ownership of the country's foreshore and seabed, with many Māori groups claiming that Māori have a rightful claim to title. These claims are based around historical possession and the Treaty of Waitangi. On 18 November 2004, the New Zealand Parliament passed a law which deems the title to be held by the Crown. This law, the Foreshore and Seabed Act 2004, was enacted on 24 November 2004. Some sections of the Act came into force on 17 January 2005. It was repealed and replaced by the Marine and Coastal Area (Takutai Moana) Act 2011.

Origins

Ngati Apa v Attorney-General

In 1997, an application was made to the Māori Land Court requesting, amongst other matters, that "the foreshore and seabed of the Marlborough Sounds, extending the limits of New Zealand's territorial sea" be defined as Māori customary land under the Te Ture Whenua Māori Act 1993. The Māori Land Court determined that it could consider the issue, but was overruled by the High Court. On 19 June 2003, New Zealand's Court of Appeal ruled in Ngati Apa v Attorney-General, amongst other matters, that:

 "The definition of 'land' in Te Ture Whenua Maori Act 1993 did not necessarily exclude foreshore and seabed";
 "The title vested in the Crown was radical title which was not inconsistent with native title";
 Various Acts had influence over but did not extinguish property rights;
 The Maori Land Court had jurisdiction to determine "an investigation of the title to the land ... under s 132 and an order determining the relative interests of the owners of the land".

In Re the Ninety-Mile Beach 

The Court of Appeal overturned a line of precedent dating back to the 1877 decision in Wi Parata v Bishop of Wellington, and affirmed by the New Zealand Court of Appeal in the 1963 Ninety Mile Beach decision. These early decisions held that because of circumstances unique to New Zealand, Māori land ties were so weak that they could be extinguished through such indirect routes as unrelated phrases in legislation or through the Native (now Māori) Land Court’s investigation of dry land adjoining the foreshore.

In its ruling, the Court of Appeal found that "native property rights are not to be extinguished by a side wind.... The need for 'clear and plain' extinguishment is well established and is not met in this case. In the Ninety-Mile Beach case, the Court did not recognise that principle of interpretation". The ruling was foreshadowed by academic work during the late 1980s and 1990s, which argued that the Ninety Mile Beach case was wrongly decided.

Initial responses
The ruling granted only the right to pursue establishing an interest. Experts such as Paul McHugh of Cambridge University stated that this was unlikely to result in full exclusive ownership, but these assurances were not strong enough to counter the perception that the door was now open for Māori to claim title to the entire coastline of New Zealand through the Māori Land Court. The prospect of a successful claim was reported as having created considerable hostility in many sectors of society as New Zealand has a strong tradition of public access to beaches and waterways and this was perceived as being under threat. The Prime Minister, Helen Clark of the Labour Party, announced that the government would legislate to ensure public ownership of the foreshore and seabed.

At the same time, however, the government was strongly attacked by the opposition National Party, led by Don Brash. In sharp contrast to Te Ope Mana a Tai, the National Party claimed that the government's proposals were too favourable towards Māori. While the government's plan did indeed vest ownership in the state, they also incorporated provision for Māori to be consulted over matters relating to the foreshore and seabed. The National Party claimed that Māori were to be given too much control, and that the government was giving rights to Māori over and above those possessed by other New Zealanders.

Once the Government's policy framework was released, the Waitangi Tribunal held an urgent inquiry into the government policy. The hearing took place over six days in late January 2004, and a report was issued four weeks later. The tribunal issued a report that was highly critical of the Crown’s approach. The Government response was equally sharp and critical, accusing the tribunal of ‘implicitly’ rejecting the principle of parliamentary sovereignty.. The Attorney-General, taking a more middle ground, conceded that the policy was prima facie discriminatory, but concluded that this infringement was "demonstrably justifiable in a free and democratic society" under section 5 of the New Zealand Bill of Rights Act 1990. The Human Rights Commission took another view, arguing that the legislation was discriminatory and not justified by section 5.

Ongoing debate

Although under attack from both sides, the government chose to press forward with its legislation, asserting that what it called its "middle way" was the only means of satisfactorily resolving the controversy. Criticism of the government, both from Māori and from opposition parties, continued to intensify, and the government began to lose ground in opinion polls.

On 27 January 2004, National Party leader Don Brash delivered a speech at Orewa that was highly critical of the government's policy towards Māori. Brash said that the government was showing strong favouritism to Māori, both in the foreshore and seabed debate and in many other areas of government policy. Brash's speech was condemned both by the government and by many Māori groups, but met with widespread approval from many other sectors of New Zealand society. This support was boosted by the successful ‘iwi/Kiwi’ billboard campaign which followed Brash’s speech. These billboards framed the foreshore debate as the Labour Party’s attempt to restrict public access to beaches, while the National Party would protect this aspect of the ‘Kiwi way of life’. Shortly afterwards, an opinion poll put the National Party ahead of the Labour Party for the first time in over 18 months.

The government was also facing serious internal debate over its proposed legislation. Many of the party's Māori MPs were deeply unhappy with the government's plans, and raised the possibility of breaking ranks to oppose the legislation in Parliament. This left the government unsure of whether it had a sufficient number of votes to pass its legislation through Parliament. In theory, the government had a narrow majority willing to support its proposed bill, with Labour, the Progressives, and United Future all prepared to vote in favour. If two of Labour's Māori MPs were to vote against the bill, however, it would fail. Moreover, any attempt to make the bill more favourable to these MPs would risk losing the support of United Future.

On 8 April 2004, it was announced that the centrist-nationalist New Zealand First party would give its support to the legislation. New Zealand First's price for this support was that ownership of the seabed and foreshore would be vested solely in the Crown, ending the concept of "public domain" (vesting ownership in the public at large rather than in the state) that United Future had promoted. United Future withdrew its support for the legislation, but New Zealand First provided sufficient votes to make this irrelevant. It is believed that Helen Clark preferred United Future's "public domain", and this was acknowledged by United Future leader Peter Dunne, but United Future could not provide enough votes to guarantee the bill's passage, forcing Labour to seek support elsewhere.

One of the strongest critics of the bill within the Labour Party was Tariana Turia, a junior minister. Turia indicated on a number of occasions that she might vote against the government's bill, but for a considerable time refused to give a final decision. It was made clear that voting against a government bill was "incompatible" with serving as a minister, and that doing so would result in Turia's dismissal from that role. Turia was encouraged to either abstain or simply be absent when the vote was taken. On 30 April, however, Turia announced that she would vote against the legislation, and would resign (effective 17 May 2004) from the Labour Party to contest a by-election in her electorate. She was dismissed from her ministerial post by the Prime Minister the same day. Another Labour MP, Nanaia Mahuta, eventually decided that she would also vote against the bill, but chose not to leave the Labour Party. Mahuta had no ministerial post to be dismissed from.

On 5 May 2004, a hikoi (a long walk or march — in this case, a protest march) arrived in Wellington. It had begun in Northland thirteen days earlier, picking up supporters as they drove to the capital. The hikoi, which some estimated to contain fifteen thousand people by the time it reached Parliament, strongly opposed the government's plans, and was highly supportive of Tariana Turia's decision.

Turia and her allies, believing that the time was right for an independent Māori political vehicle, established a new Māori Party. Many of Turia's supporters, such as Mana Motuhake leader Willie Jackson and Māori academic Pita Sharples, claimed that Māori who formerly supported Labour would flock to the new party en masse. On the other hand, other commentators pointed to a poor track record for Māori parties in the past, and said that it would be difficult to unite diverse Māori opinion into a single group.

On 18 November 2004, Tim Selwyn put an axe through a window of the electorate office of Helen Clark, an act he described as a protest against Helen Clark's handling of the issue.

Legislation
On 18 November 2004, the Labour/Progressive government passed the Foreshore and Seabed Act, which declared that the land in question was owned by the Crown. Māori can, however, apply for "guardianship" of certain areas. The Act was highly contentious.

The government's foreshore and seabed bill passed its first vote in Parliament on 7 May 2004, backed by Labour, the Progressives, and New Zealand First. The National Party opposed the bill, saying that it gave too much control to Māori, United Future opposed it due to the removal of the public domain concept and ACT opposed it on the grounds of the legislation being retrospective, that it was a denial of property rights (in this case Māori property rights), and that it was an unwarranted incursion by the Crown into areas that were specifically Tikanga Māori . The Greens, another party in Parliament to take a position similar to that of the Māori protesters, also voted against the bill, saying that it overrode Māori rights and offered no guarantee that the land would not later be sold. Tariana Turia and Nanaia Mahuta both voted against the bill. The first vote tally was 65 in favour and 55 against. The Deputy Prime Minister, Michael Cullen, told Parliament that the bill "safeguards the seabed and foreshore for everyone", protecting the rights of both Māori and non-Māori. Opposition to the bill remained strong, however, and protests and criticism continued as the government's legislation progressed.

The bill's passage through its first vote meant that it was then considered by a special select committee of Parliament, which heard public submissions on the matter. The select committee having allowed six months for submissions, reported back to the parliament in November that they had been unable to agree on a position and were therefore reporting back the bill with no recommendations whatsoever. The bill, slightly amended by the Government itself, passed its second vote on 17 November 2004 by the same margin as in the first vote. It was then considered by a Committee of the House (with Parliament sitting under urgency). It finally received its third vote on 18 November 2004. The final vote tally was 66 in favour and 54 against — Nanaia Mahuta, who had previously voted against, this time voted in favour.

On 15 December, the legislation was modified slightly after it was realised that as it was written, the Act nationalised all council-owned land reclaimed from the sea. This includes areas such as Auckland's Britomart and Wellington's waterfront. This was not part of the intention of the act.

The United Nations Committee on the Elimination of Racial Discrimination, after being asked by Te Runanga o Ngāi Tahu to consider the legislation, issued a report on 12 March 2005 stating that the foreshore and seabed legislation discriminates against Māori by extinguishing the possibility of establishing Māori customary title over the foreshore and seabed, and by not providing a means of redress. Tariana Turia and the Māori Party claimed this as a significant victory, although the report has not prompted any change in government policy.

Situation following the controversy
The foreshore and seabed issue, as part of the larger race relations debate, was one of the most significant points of contention in New Zealand politics at the time, and remains a significant issue for many people. The Labour government's popularity was severely damaged by the affair, although subsequent polls showed that it recovered its support and Labour was elected for a third term in September 2005.

While the Act was widely criticised by Māori, some iwi have chosen to negotiate agreement within the bounds of the Act. The first agreement made through the act was ratified by Ngati Porou and the Crown in October 2008 (see below).

Special Rapporteur
In November 2005, following government criticism of the report issued by the UN Committee on the Elimination of Racial Discrimination (UNCERD), Special Rapporteur Professor Stavenhagen, a Mexican researcher who reports to UNCERD, arrived in New Zealand at the invitation of the Government.  He attended four hui and heard severe criticism of the government.  He also met with Deputy Prime Minister, Dr Michael Cullen who crafted the foreshore law. While the Foreshore and Seabed issue was central to his visit, discussions also related to Treaty of Waitangi settlements, and economic, social and cultural rights generally. On 25 November 2005 he issued a statement which noted that “[w]hile the standard of living of the Māori of New Zealand has improved and is better than that of indigenous peoples in poorer countries, there is widespread concern that the gap in social and economic conditions is actually growing larger and an increasing proportion of Māori are being left behind”.  His final report was completed in March 2006.  It was highly critical of the Government in a number of areas, including the Foreshore and Seabed Act, which it recommended should be repealed or significantly amended.  The Government response to this further criticism was again negative describing Professor Stavenhagen's report as "disappointing, unbalanced and narrow".

Member's bill
In October 2006, Tariana Turia introduced a member's bill designed to repeal the Foreshore and Seabed Act. In recreating the legal status before the Foreshore and Seabed Act was passed, however, the bill was reported to vest ownership of the foreshore and seabed in the Crown. Turia denied that her bill would do anything but repeal the Foreshore and Seabed Act 2004 in its entirety and described Labour's descriptions as "scaremongering".

First foreshore and seabed agreement signed
The first foreshore and Seabed agreement was ratified on 31 October 2008. The agreement was negotiated between people of the Ngati Porou area on New Zealand's East Cape and the Crown (effectively the New Zealand government). The NZPA reported about 200 people representing Ngati Porou were present to witness the signing of the deed. The deed protects customary rights of local iwi and retains wider public access to Ngati Porou coastal areas.

Continued calls for repeal
Following a change of government with the election of National in November 2008, the Green Party continued to call for repeal of the Foreshore and Seabed Act 2004.

National front bencher Christopher Finlayson, sworn in as Minister for Treaty of Waitangi negotiations in November 2008, has described the act as "discriminatory and unfair". Commentary at the time of his appointment suggested the Foreshore and Seabed Act would be reviewed under a National government.

Announcement of repeal
On 14 June 2010, Prime Minister John Key announced that he would be proposing the repeal of the Act. The replacement Marine and Coastal Area (Takutai Moana) Act, proposed in late 2010, in turn created opposition from both sides. Some Maori argued that the bill was a fraud as essentially no Maori groups would meet the test for increased rights to the foreshore, while others, such as the Coastal Coalition, felt that the bill risks free access to coastal areas for a large part of New Zealanders.

See also
Coastline of New Zealand
Māori protest movement
Coastal Coalition

References

External links
Official government website on the issue
Ministry of Justice Marine and Coastal Area page
Foreshore and seabed information page
Te Ope Mana a Tai- a lobby group in favour of Māori ownership.
A Primer on the Foreshore and Seabed - Written by Moana Jackson to provide some context on the Bill.
The Waitangi Tribunal report into the Foreshore and Seabed legislation
Law of the foreshore and seabed – entry in Te Ara regarding the modern legal challenges surrounding the controversy
T akutai Moana - Community Law online manual on the Bill and its background and the rights it provides for.

Foreshore and seabed
Race relations in New Zealand
Foreshore and seabed controversy
Foreshore and seabed
Foreshore and seabed
Aboriginal title in New Zealand
Controversies in New Zealand